Ian McLeod may refer to:

 Ian McLeod (boxer) (born 1969), Scottish boxer
 Ian McLeod (businessman), Scottish businessman
 Ian McLeod (cyclist) (born 1980), South African road racing cyclist
 Ian McLeod (referee) (1954–2017), South African football referee
 Ian R. MacLeod (born 1956), British science fiction and fantasy author

See also
 Iain MacLeod (disambiguation)